Dictyostega is a genus of flowering plants in the Burmanniaceae, first described as a genus in 1840. It contains only one known species, Dictyostega orobanchoides, native to southern Mexico (Veracruz, Chiapas, Oaxaca), Central America, Trinidad, and South America (Brazil, French Guiana, Suriname, Guyana, Venezuela, Colombia, Peru, Bolivia)).

Subspecies
 Dictyostega orobanchoides subsp. orobanchoides - most of species range
 Dictyostega orobanchoides subsp. parviflora (Benth.) Snelders & Maas - Panama, Trinidad, South America
 Dictyostega orobanchoides subsp. purdieana (Benth.) Snelders & Maas - Panama, Venezuela, Colombia, Ecuador, Peru

References

Burmanniaceae
Monotypic Dioscoreales genera
Flora of North America
Flora of South America